Rein Jansma (1959) is a Dutch architect and co-founder of the architectural studio ZJA.

Early life and education 
Jansma was born in 1959 in an artistic environment to parents that were interested in both art and science and were politically active  artistic and politically active family. His father Arie Jansma was as visual artist, who once exhibited at the Stedelijk Museum in Amsterdam and his mother was a mathematician named Jeanne Nancy ('Oekie') van Dulm. Renowned Dutch designers and artists like Wim Crouwel, Benno Premsela, Dick Elffers, and Cas Oorthuys were regular guests at their house and influenced Rein Jansma's upbringing.

Jansma met Moshé Zwarts as a teenager, because Zwarts was a good friend of his parents. Zwarts recognised in Jansma a "brilliant boy" and a "true autodidact".

He briefly enrolled in studies in biology as well as architecture at Delft University of Technology but finished neither.

Career 
He was drawn to "making things" and following his own diverse interests. This included the publication of Stairs in 1981, a pop-up book with compositions of simple cut-outs of folded stairs and no text. It gained international acclaim for its architectural elegance and has been reprinted several times since. The publication is included in several museum collections, such as Stedelijk Museum Amsterdam the Fine Arts Museums of San Francisco. Jansma was also briefly involved in set design in Paris and Amsterdam.

At the end of the 1980s, Jansma started collaborating with Zwarts. After the duo won several architectural design competitions, they decided to start an architectural studio together in 1990, now known as ZJA (formerly Zwarts & Jansma Architects). The studio quickly gained success and over the years has taken on a wide variety of projects, with an emphasis on public infrastructure and technical innovation. Jansma received his title as architect based on his extensive experience and portfolio of projects at ZJA. Jansma's approach to architecture is characterised by curiosity and exploration, a fascination for physics and the natural world as well as a love of art and a keen sense of technological possibility.

Bibliography

External links 

 ZJA page about Rein Jansma

References 

Living people
1959 births
Dutch architects